A fire proximity suit (also, silvers, silver bunker suit, or asbestos suit) is a suit designed to protect a firefighter or volcanologist from extremely high temperatures. They were first designed and used in the 1930s. Originally made of asbestos fabric, current models use vacuum-deposited aluminized materials.

History 
Fire proximity suits first appeared during the 1930s, and were originally made of asbestos fabric. Today they are manufactured from vacuum-deposited aluminized materials that reflect the high radiant loads produced by the fire.

An early manufacturer of the aluminized suits was the Bristol Uniforms company under of Patrick Seager Hill.

Types 
There are three basic types of these aluminized suits:
 Approach suit—used for work in the general area of high temperatures such as steel mills and smelting facilities. These usually provide ambient heat protection up to ≈.
 Proximity suit—used for aircraft rescue and fire fighting (AR-FF) and, in more heavily insulated versions, for kiln work requiring entry into the heated kiln. The former provide ambient heat protection up to ≈, while the latter provide much higher degrees of protection, sometimes up to ≈.
 Entry suit—used for entry into extreme heat and situations requiring protection from total flame engulfment. Most commonly made of Zetex or vermiculite and not aluminized. These provide ambient protection up to ≈ for short duration, and prolonged radiant heat protection up to ≈.

Complete proximity protection for AR-FF requires:
 Aluminized hood or helmet cover with neck shroud
 Aluminized jacket and pants complete with vapor barrier insulated liner
 Aluminized lined gloves
 Aluminized AR-FF boots
 Self-contained breathing apparatus (SCBA) (aluminized covers for air bottles, or suits that cover the air pack are also available)

See also

References

External links 
  – contemporary article on asbestos suits

Firefighting equipment
Fire protective clothing
Environmental suits
Safety clothing